Providence St. Mel School (PSM) is a private, coeducational Preschool-12th Grade school in East Garfield Park, Chicago, Illinois.

History 

The school was created in 1969 with the merger of two schools, Providence High School and St. Mel High School. In 1978 the Archdiocese of Chicago decided to close it. The principal, Paul J. Adams III, and administrators of the school chose instead to operate it as an independent school, after the Sisters of Providence of Saint Mary-of-the-Woods, owners of the school building, agreed to sell it to them for a low price.

In 1982 and 1983, President Ronald Reagan visited the school. In 1993, Oprah Winfrey donated $1,000,000.

The October 2006 issue of Chicago magazine ranked Providence St. Mel as one of the most outstanding elementary schools in the metropolitan area. The school earned a place on the magazine's "A+ Team", the list of select 115 public and 25 private elementary and middle schools.

Most recently, the school was listed as 44 of 59 (Best Private K-12 Schools in Illinois) and 113 of 142 and 83 of 138 (Best Private High Schools in Illinois), with a 100% graduation rate.

Alumni 

 Lil Rel Howery, comedian
 Linton Johnson, professional basketball player
 Bernie Leahy (1908–1978), NFL player; attended St. Mel High School
 Lee Loughnane, trumpet player for the American rock band Chicago
 Bob Ociepka, professional basketball coach
 Tom O'Halleran, Member of the United States House of Representatives from Arizona's 1st district
 Gene Pingatore, high school basketball coach
 Frank Quilici, professional baseball player

See also 

 The Providence Effect, a documentary film about the school

References

External links 
 
 Reviews and profile on GreatSchools.org
 Google map of the school

Private elementary schools in Chicago
Private high schools in Chicago
Private middle schools in Chicago
Sisters of Providence of Saint Mary-of-the-Woods
Educational institutions established in 1968
1968 establishments in Illinois
African-American Roman Catholic schools